Adelheid "Heiderose" Wallbaum-Höfle (born 24 February 1951) is a West German sprint canoer who competed in the early to mid-1970s. She won a silver medal in the K-4 500 m event at the 1971 ICF Canoe Sprint World Championships in Belgrade.

Wallbaum also finished fifth in the K-2 500 m event at the 1976 Summer Olympics in Montreal.

References

1951 births
Canoeists at the 1976 Summer Olympics
West German female canoeists
Living people
Olympic canoeists of West Germany
ICF Canoe Sprint World Championships medalists in kayak